The Hurry and the Harm is the fourth studio album by City and Colour. It was produced by Alex Newport and released on June 4, 2013, through Dine Alone Records and Cooking Vinyl.

The album received a score of 67 out of 100 from 10 critics on review aggregator Metacritic, indicating "generally favorable reviews".

Commercial performance
The Hurry and the Harm debuted at No. 1 on the Canadian Albums Chart, selling 23,000 copies in its first week. It was City and Colour's second consecutive album to debut at No. 1 on the chart. Up to January 10, 2014, the album had sold 66,000 copies in Canada. The album was certified Platinum in Canada on February 13, 2014.

The album also debuted at No. 16 on the US Billboard 200 chart, selling 20,000 for the week. The album had sold 71,000 copies in the US up to September 2015.

Track listing

Personnel
Dallas Green – vocals, guitar
Spencer Cullum Jr. – pedal steel
Jack Lawrence – bass guitar
Matt Chamberlain – drums
James Gadson – drums (tracks 2 and 8)
Bo Koster – keyboards
Anthony Lamarchina – cello
Karen Winkelmann – violin

Production
Alex Newport – producer, engineering, mixing, mastering

Charts

Weekly charts

Year-end charts

Certifications

References

2013 albums
City and Colour albums
Cooking Vinyl albums
Dine Alone Records albums
Albums produced by Alex Newport